Celica may refer to:

Celica, Ecuador, capital of the below canton
Celica Canton, canton in Loja Province, Ecuador
Toyota Celica, sports car
Celica GT-4, a high performance model of the Celica Liftback
Toyota Celica Camry, a four-door sports sedan
Toyota Celica LB Turbo, a Group 5 Special Production racecar
Toyota Celica Supra, a sports car and grand tourer
 Celica, one of the two protagonists of Fire Emblem Gaiden and its remake, Fire Emblem Echoes: Shadows of Valentia
 Celica A. Mercury, a fictional character from the BlazBlue series